Thomas Drummond Perrin (26 February 1911– 21 April 1975) was an Australian Rugby Union player who represented for the Wallabies twice.

Early life
Perrin was born in Summer Hill and attended Newington College (1924–1927).

Club rugby
He grew up in Mosman and as a second rower joined Northern Suburbs Rugby Club after leaving school and played in their premiership side in 1933.

Representative rugby
He toured New Zealand in 1931 with the Wallabies and played in seven of the ten games played and two tests.

References

Tom Perrin at espnscrum

1911 births
1975 deaths
Australian rugby union players
People educated at Newington College
Australia international rugby union players
Rugby union locks
Rugby union players from Sydney